Annacurra or Annacurragh is a small village in South-East County Wicklow, Ireland. It is located just off the R747 road which runs from Arklow to Baltinglass and is about 1.5 miles from Aughrim. The River Derry runs through the village.

Sport
The village's Gaelic Athletic Association (GAA) club, Annacurra GAA, had a number of successes in the early days of the GAA. The club won the first three Senior championships between 1887 and 1889 and went on to win the championship a total of nine times. More recently, the club are a senior team, having won promotion by winning the intermediate championship in 2010. The club play their home games at Joey Doyle Park and their colours are green and yellow. Clubman Alan Byrne lined out as at corner and full back positions on Mick O'Dwyer and Harry Murphy's Wicklow senior football teams.

See also
 List of towns and villages in Ireland

References

External links
 Annacurra Parish (archived)

Towns and villages in County Wicklow